Margaret Herrera Chávez (1912–1992) was an American painter and printmaker.

Born in Las Vegas, New Mexico, Chávez was the daughter of ranchers, and grew up in Gascon, in Mora County. She worked as an elementary schoolteacher and for the Works Progress Administration, and sometimes exhibited her work under the name Mrs. Paul Chávez. She won multiple prizes for her work exhibited at the Museum of Fine Arts during her life and was one of only two female artists featured in Jacinto Quirarte's book, Mexican American Artists. Her works are in the permanent collections of the New Mexico Museum of Art, Museum of International Folk Art and Highlands University.

Style and work 
Chávez was a self-taught artist who painted primarily in watercolor and oils, and also practiced printmaking. She later completed formal training at Highlands University, Las Vegas; The University of New Mexico, Albuquerque; and the Instituto San Miguel de Allende, Guanajuato, Mexico.

The landscape of northern New Mexico where she grew up provided inspiration for much of her work, which consisted primarily of broad views of landscapes painted in light colors. Her affiliation with the Works Progress Administration and New Deal art projects also influenced her style.

Activism 

Chávez promoted the work of New Mexican women artists through her membership in the National League of American Pen Women (NLAPW), during which she served as president of the Albuquerque branch and chair of the New Mexico State Art Committee. She also belonged to the Hispanic Cultural Society, New Mexico Education Association, and the National Education Association.

References

1912 births
1992 deaths
American women painters
American women printmakers
20th-century American painters
20th-century American printmakers
20th-century American women artists
People from Las Vegas, New Mexico
People from Mora County, New Mexico
Painters from New Mexico
Works Progress Administration in New Mexico
Hispanic and Latino American women in the arts
American artists of Mexican descent